James Aye Oruwori is the Anglican Bishop of Ogbia in Niger Delta Province  of the Church of Nigeria.

Oruwori was Bishop of Ogbia at the first synod of the Diocese at St.Stephen's Anglican Church, Otuoke, Ogbia in 2012, at which President Goodluck Jonathan spoke, and at the Provincial Bishops' Missionary conference held in the Anglican Diocese of Lagos West in 2008.

References 

Anglican bishops of Ogbia
21st-century Anglican bishops in Nigeria
Nigerian Anglicans
Year of birth missing (living people)
Living people